WSHS (91.7) is a student-run high school radio and public radio station operating on a non-commercial license in Sheboygan, Wisconsin. Owned by the Sheboygan Area School District, the station's studio is located on the second floor of Sheboygan North High School on the city's north side, and the transmitter is located in the central courtyard of the North High building. An auxiliary studio is also located at Sheboygan South High School, though most programming originates out of North High. The station's signal covers most of Sheboygan and portions of Kohler and the towns of Mosel, Sheboygan and Wilson, and is also simulcast as the audio on the district's South-produced cable channel SASD TV during non-programming hours, which is carried on Spectrum and AT&T U-verse systems in Sheboygan, Fond du Lac and Washington Counties.

History

The station came on the air in 1968, and was the first high school radio station in the state of Wisconsin. Under the direction of North High French/Radio teacher, the late Jerrold Molepske, some local and state personalities had their starts on the air of WSHS, like current Milwaukee radio host WTMJ Radio (620)'s Gene Mueller and Dick Alpert, the current traffic reporter and director for iHeartMedia's Madison and Milwaukee radio clusters, and for television partner WITI (Channel 6) in Milwaukee. Locally, WHBL/WHBZ (1330/106.5))'s Josh Dekker had his start during "South Nights" in the mid-1990s.

During the school year, the station runs a music format from 8am-6pm CST, which is run by broadcasting students at North with a variety of genres played, including Top 40, soft rock, alternative music, and some hard rock, with its longtime slogan being "Where variety is the sound". As the station is also an educational tool for the students, WSHS also runs news briefs, weather forecasts and fact segments (such as trivia questions, "Today in History", and "Birthdays") at various times throughout the day, along with taking requests via the phone and an in-studio fax machine (NPR News is also broadcast at the top of every hour in student-operated hours). All of the station's DJs are required to take two semesters of broadcasting classes, go through an application process, and be selected by the station manager before they can have an on-air shift on the station (requirements have been adjusted over the years; before the Telecommunications Act of 1996, a non-commercial FCC license was required for a student to take to the airwaves). Formerly the station broadcast both North and South high school athletics play-by-play with student commentary, though this role has been ceded in recent years to the SASD TV cable channel, along with WHBL's occasional broadcasts of athletic events.

Programming
After school hours, the station serves as the Sheboygan affiliate of the Ideas Network of Wisconsin Public Radio (WPR), which has a talk format, and acts mainly as a repeater of the schedule for WPR's Green Bay station, WHID (88.1). This was begun in the fall of 2000 to provide full-time programming for the station, as local translators for religious broadcasters began to fill the lower band of Sheboygan's radio dial, making reception of the Ideas Network's Milwaukee area affiliate, WHAD (90.7) (based in Delafield, a further location than the common tower farm on Milwaukee's east side) near impossible except for car radio reception. Family Radio's station WMWK, also on 88.1, from Milwaukee, makes most reception of WHID in the area impossible, though WSHS uses a mix of a satellite feed and tower reception of WHID with WMWK's transmission filtered out depending on conditions to translate the station. The full-time schedule also made any attempt for a religious organization to challenge a license renewal and claim the frequency from the Sheboygan Area School District due to lack of service unlikely, a strategy attempted with WEPS in Elgin, Illinois, which has also since used WPR Ideas Network programming to fill non-school hours.

With WYVM, a new station which repeats the programming of Suring's WRVM coming to the air north of Sheboygan on 90.9 on December 3, 2012, WHAD has lost nearly all its Sheboygan reception, leaving WSHS and the network's web stream the only way to listen to Ideas Network programming in the area.

The Ideas Network also runs almost all day on weekends and throughout the summer break, along with any school holidays. Since the fall of 2009 WPR hours have been extended during the school year due to budget constraints, and WPR programming currently starts at 4pm on most weekdays, with a 2pm start on Wednesdays due to that day's early dismissal schedule, and 1pm on most Fridays in order to accommodate the WPR broadcast of NPR's Science Friday, though WSHS may air unexpected music programming via pre-racked music at times if station staff do not transition to the Ideas Network feed at local sign-off. Locally-based programming is not streamed online, though WSHS's station identification reminds listeners that the full Ideas Network schedule is available through WPR's website and smart speakers during student/leased hours.

During the latter part of the week, ethnic broadcasters air their programming on the station. A Hmong language talk/music program to serve the local Hmong population locally originated from the local Hmong Mutual Assistance Association since 1983 and hosted by Vue Yang airs on Thursdays after 4:30 pm, while a local Spanish program consisting of mostly music airs on Friday or Saturday mornings. During the summer, Mead Public Library leases time on the station on Thursday evenings to broadcast live concerts from the stage of the nearby City Green, in cooperation with the John Michael Kohler Arts Center (this audio is simulcast through the library's Live365 stream). The locally originated ethnic programs broker their time from the school district to carry their programming.

Previous history of calls in Floral Park, NY
From 1950 to approximately the early 60s, the calls of WSHS were used by the high school radio station of Floral Park, New York's Sewanhaka High School, just east of Queens on Long Island. The station broadcast at 90.3 FM.

Serving New York and Nassau County, it aired NAEB (National Association of Educational Broadcasters) produced and tape recorded educational programs directed to mostly elementary schools in the surrounding area with high school students as staff and the English department supervising the on-air staff of announcing and programming personnel most of whom were trained in special classes designed for that purpose. The technical staff were students from the V0-Tech department's electronics classes supervised by a professional broadcast engineer.

Broadcast hours were limited to a few hours morning afternoon during school hours. From 5 to 7 PM the high school students provided original live programming which included public service programs serving the community and music. The station also broadcast Sewanhaka Chieftains football games and other sports. Several of the students went on to professional careers in broadcasting after graduation from high school and/or college. The 90.3 frequency today is utilized by WKRB in Brooklyn.

See also
 Sheboygan North High School
 Sheboygan Area School District

References

External links
 
 WSHS programming schedule
 Further station details from WPR site

SHS-FM
Wisconsin Public Radio
NPR member stations
High school radio stations in the United States
Radio stations established in 1968